The  2017 Beijing Sinobo Guoan F.C. season  was their 14th consecutive season in the Chinese Super League, established in the 2004 season, and 27th consecutive season in the top flight of Chinese football. They competed in the Chinese Super League and Chinese FA Cup.

First team
As of August 2, 2017

Transfers

Winter

In:

 
 

 

 
 

Out:

Summer

In:

Out:

Staff

|}

Friendlies

Pre-season

Mid–season

Competitions

Chinese Super League

Table

Matches

Chinese FA Cup

National team

References

Beijing Guoan F.C. seasons
Chinese football clubs 2017 season